The second series of the British medical drama television series Holby City commenced airing in the United Kingdom on BBC One on 25 November 1999, and concluded on 9 March 2000.

Production
Following its first series run of nine 50 minute episodes, the second series of Holby City ran for an extended 16 hour-long episodes. The series aired on BBC One, and moved from Tuesdays to Thursday nights.

Reception
On 22 November 1999, three days before the series première, then director of Channel 4 Gub Neal called for the BBC to cease production of its drama programmes. Neal highlighted Holby City as an example of the station's "safe" programming, denouncing what he perceived to be the abandonment of quality productions in favour of star-led series and "an endless soup of indistinctive programmes".

Reviewing "Search for the Hero", The Guardian Nancy Banks-Smith commented on the series' casting: "I had the uneasy sensation that I had met half these people before in assorted soap operas. If I am having an emergency Caesarean in economy class, the last person I want to see at the other end of the cleverly improvised coathanger is Cindy's fancy man from EastEnders." Fellow Guardian critic Adam Sweeting criticised the series' writing, observing: "In Holby, no cliché need ever fear being denied admittance." Natasha Joffe too was critical of the series' writing, opining that Holby City seemed "a bit soggy" following Nick's departure, and criticising the "Casualty-esque love of didactic plot mirroring" between the doctor and patient storylines.

By February 2000, Holby City had become the only new drama series under BBC One controller Peter Salmon to average more than 9 million viewers. The series saw Griffin win the "Best Actress" award at the 2000 Ethnic Multicultural Media Awards for her role as Jasmine.

Cast 
The series featured an ensemble cast of characters in the medical profession. Returning from the show's first series were George Irving as consultant Anton Meyer, Michael French and Dawn McDaniel as registrars Nick Jordan and Kirstie Collins, Lisa Faulkner as senior house officer Victoria Merrick, Sarah Preston and Angela Griffin as ward sisters Karen Newburn and Jasmine Hopkins, Nicola Stephenson as nurse Julie Fitzjohn, and Ian Curtis as senior staff nurse Ray Sykes. The series also introduced Clive Mantle as general surgical consultant Mike Barratt, Jan Pearson as ward sister Kath Shaughnessy, Jeremy Edwards as Kath's son, healthcare assistant Danny Shaughnessy, and Thusitha Jayasundera as general surgical registrar Tash Bandara. Mantle had previously played the same character in Casualty. French departed from the show during the course of the series, and Preston and Curtis did not return for series three. French attributed his departure to the programme becoming "uninteresting and formulaic", commenting: "There should be drama on television which is constantly challenging the audience. Not what the big bosses think will bring in the ratings. Someone has got to be brave and revolutionary."

Main characters 
Ian Curtis as Ray Sykes (until episode 16)
Jeremy Edwards as Danny Shaughnessy (from episode 1)
Lisa Faulkner as Victoria Merrick
Michael French as Nick Jordan (until episode 14)
Angela Griffin as Jasmine Hopkins
George Irving as Anton Meyer
Thusitha Jayasundera as Tash Bandara (from episode 5)
Clive Mantle as Mike Barratt (from episode 5)
Dawn McDaniel as Kirstie Collins
Jan Pearson as Kath Shaughnessy (from episode 5)
Sarah Preston as Karen Newburn (until episode 16)
Nicola Stephenson as Julie Fitzjohn

Recurring and guest characters 
Alex Avery as Carl (until episode 1)
Matt Dempsey as Damien Wetherall (episodes 4−10)
Kwame Kwei-Armah as Fin Newton (episodes 10 and 13)
Cathy Shipton as Lisa 'Duffy' Duffin (episode 5)

Episodes

References

External links
 Holby City series 2 (1999) at BBC Online
 Holby City series 2 (2000) at BBC Online
 Holby City series 2 at the Internet Movie Database

02
1999 British television seasons
2000 British television seasons